Omphalotrochus is an extinct taxonomic genus of Paleozoic gastropods. It is widely distributed in the upper Paleozoic and has been an important index fossil.

Species 
Species in the genus Omphalotrochus include:
 O. alleni Yochelson, 1956
 O. antiquus d'Orbigny, 1842
 O. calaniculatus Trautschold, 1879
 O. cochisensis Yochelson, 1956
 O. hessensis Yochelson, 1956
 O. kalitvaensis Licharev, 1940
 O. kalmiussi Zernetskaya, 1967
 O. karakubensis Zernetskaya, 1967
 O. obtusispira Shumard, 1859
 O. spinosus Yochelson, 1956
 O. whitneyi Meek, 1864
 O. wolfcampensis Yochelson, 1956

References 

Prehistoric gastropod genera